Cola cabindensis is a species of flowering plant in the family Malvaceae. It is found only in Cabinda, Republic of the Congo, and Democratic Republic of the Congo. According to IUCN this species is found at only seven different locations, with a total area of occupancy estimated at just 44 km2.

References

cabindensis
Vulnerable flora of Africa
Taxa named by Arthur Wallis Exell